Jonas Björkman won the title defeating Radek Štěpánek 6–3, 7–6(7–4)  in the final.

Seeds

Draw

Finals

Top half

Bottom half

References

 Main Draw
 Qualifying Draw

Ho Chi Minh City Open
Kingfisher Airlines Tennis Open